Malcolm Ian Cook (born 24 May 1943) is a Scottish former professional football player and coach.

Career
Born in Glasgow, Cook played as a wing half for St Roch's, Motherwell, Bradford Park Avenue, Newport County and Margate.

After retiring as a player, Cook became a coach, working with Kenny Dalglish at Liverpool.

References

Living people
1943 births
Scottish footballers
St Roch's F.C. players
Motherwell F.C. players
Bradford (Park Avenue) A.F.C. players
Newport County A.F.C. players
Margate F.C. players
English Football League players
Association football wing halves
Footballers from Glasgow
Liverpool F.C. non-playing staff
Scottish Junior Football Association players